Gary Mason may refer to:

 Gary Mason (boxer) (1962–2011), British boxer
 Gary Mason (footballer) (born 1979), Scottish professional footballer
 Gary H. Mason, music producer, promoter and music video director
 Gary Mason (motorcycle racer) (born 1979), British motorcycle road racer
 Gary Mason (journalist), Canadian journalist